This is a bibliography of works on the Ainu people of modern Japan and the Russian Far East.

Overview

Politics

Anthropology

History

Historiography

Culture

Language

 

 

 
 
 

 

 

 

Proposed classifications

Articles
Music of the Ainu in 
Fresh Light on the Ainu in 
The Inau Cult of the Ainu, Leo Sterns Erg, in

Gallery

See also

Filmography of the Ainu

B
Ainu